Robert Harper Clarkson (November 19, 1826 – March 10, 1884) was an American prelate of the Episcopal Church, who served as the first Bishop of Nebraska between 1865 and 1884.

Biography 
Clarkson was born in Gettysburg, Pennsylvania. He was ordained deacon on June 18, 1848, by Bishop William Rollinson Whittingham of Maryland, and priest on January 5, 1851, by Presiding Bishop Philander Chase. He married Meliora McPherson on May 18, 1849. They had two daughters, Mary and Nellie.

He arrived in Chicago with his new wife at the time of the 1849 Chicago cholera outbreak that killed 678 people.  Although some other clergymen fled the city, he stayed and ministered to the sick and buried the dead, until he came down with cholera himself.

He was consecrated Missionary Bishop of Nebraska and Dakota on November 15, 1865.

Clarkson received a B.A. from Pennsylvania College in 1844, a B.D. from St James' College in Hagerstown, Maryland, and a D.D. from Racine College in 1857 while rector of St. James's Episcopal Church, Chicago, Illinois. He received an LL.D. from the University of Nebraska in 1872.

He helped establish the first Christian missions to the Ponca Indians.

During his time as bishop, he was responsible for building fifty churches in his diocese, and a children's hospital and Trinity Cathedral in Omaha.  This Late Gothic Revival cathedral was consecrated on November 15, 1883, and was added to the National Register of Historic Places in 1974.

References

External links
Documents by and about Clarkson from Project Canterbury

1826 births
1884 deaths
People from Gettysburg, Pennsylvania
Gettysburg College alumni
University of Nebraska alumni
Racine College alumni
19th-century American Episcopalians
Episcopal bishops of Nebraska
19th-century American clergy